David Abrard (born 27 November 1976 in Sainte-Adresse, Seine-Maritime) is a retired butterfly swimmer from France, who represented his native country at the 1996 Summer Olympics in Atlanta, Georgia.

Abrard is best known for winning the bronze medal in the men's 200 m butterfly at the 1996 European SC Championships in Rostock, alongside Switzerland's Adrian Andermatt.

References

External links
 

1976 births
Living people
French male butterfly swimmers
Olympic swimmers of France
Swimmers at the 1996 Summer Olympics